Malloum is a surname. Notable people with the surname include:

Bintou Malloum (1946–2020), Chadian politician and diplomat
Félix Malloum (1932–2009), Chadian politician